Kiisa is a small town in Saku Parish, Harju County, Estonia. As of 2011 Census, the settlement had a population of 713.

It has a railway station on the Tallinn - Viljandi railway line operated by Elron (rail transit).

Kiisa is the location of a currently under construction Kiisa Emergency Reserve Power Plant.

References

External links
Saku Parish

Boroughs and small boroughs in Estonia